Liu Yuan (born 7 September 1985) is an Austrian table tennis player. She competed in the women's team event at the 2020 Summer Olympics.

She was born in China, emigrated to Italy, and in 2005 she emigrated to Austria.

References

External links
 

1985 births
Living people
Austrian female table tennis players
Olympic table tennis players of Austria
Table tennis players at the 2020 Summer Olympics
Place of birth missing (living people)